The Roman Catholic Diocese of Januária is a diocese located in the city of Januária in the Ecclesiastical province of Montes Claros in Brazil.

History
 15 June 1957: Established as Diocese of Januária from the Diocese of Montes Claros and Territorial Prelature of Paracatu

Leadership
 Bishops of Januária (Roman rite)
Daniel Tavares Baeta Neves † (16 May 1958 - 1 June 1962) Resigned
João Batista Przyklenk, M.S.F. † (1 June 1962 - 1 March 1976) appointed, Vicar Apostolic of Tromsø
Anselmo Müller, M.S.F. † (25 April 1984 - 12 November 2008) Retired
José Moreira da Silva (12 Nov 2008–present)

References

 Giga-Catholic Information
 Catholic Hierarchy

Roman Catholic dioceses in Brazil
Christian organizations established in 1957
Januária, Roman Catholic Diocese of
Roman Catholic dioceses and prelatures established in the 20th century